Waimea-Kohala Airport  is a state-owned public-use airport located one nautical mile (2 km) southwest of Kamuela (also known as Waimea), an unincorporated town in Hawai‘i County, Hawai‘i, United States.

Hawaiian Airlines began scheduled passenger service from the airport in November 1953. As of 2016 the only scheduled air service is by Mokulele Airlines, which offers twice daily service to Kahului, Maui (OGG).

It is included in the Federal Aviation Administration National Plan of Integrated Airport Systems for 2021–2025, in which it is categorized as a non-primary commercial service facility.

Facilities and aircraft 

The airport has one taxiway and an aircraft parking apron at the west end of the runway serving the passenger terminal and general aviation facilities. No fueling or airport traffic control tower facilities are provided. An aircraft rescue and fire fighting facility shares space in the airport maintenance facility.

For the 12-month period ending June 30, 2016, the airport had 4,178 aircraft operations, an average of 11 per day:  57% air taxi, 31% general aviation and 12% military. In April 2022, there were 4 aircraft based at this airport: 2 single-engine and 2 multi-engine.

Airline and destination 

Mokulele Airlines serves the airport with Cessna 208EX Grand Caravan commuter turboprop aircraft.

Previously, Pacific Wings operated service to Honolulu and Kahului. Originally subsidized by the Essential Air Service program, Pacific Wings began serving Waimea-Kohala without subsidy on April 1, 2007. By May 2013, when reports emerged the airline was ending all service in Hawaii, the airline had already ceased serving Waimea-Kohala Airport. Mokulele Airlines, Schuman Aviation, and Pacific Wings submitted bids to the DOT to provide service at the airport, however only Mokulele and Schuman have proposed actual flights—Pacific Wings suggested two buses a day to Kona.  On July 2, 2013, the US DOT awarded the contract to Mokulele Airlines for service to Kahului. Mokulele began operating flights to Waimea-Kohala on September 21, 2013.

Historical airline service 

The airport previously had scheduled passenger jet service operated by Aloha Airlines and Hawaiian Airlines, both of which referred to the airport as Kamuela in their respective system timetables during the 1960s.  In 1966, Hawaiian Airlines was operating a daily Douglas DC-9-10 jet flight with a routing of Hilo (ITO) - Kamuela (MUE) - Kahului, Maui (OGG) - Honolulu (HNL) and was also serving the airport with Convair 640 turboprops on flights to Honolulu, Maui and Kona at this time. In 1968, Aloha Airlines was flying daily British Aircraft Corporation BAC One-Eleven jet service with a routing of Kamuela (MUE) - Kahului, Maui (OGG) - Honolulu (HNL) and was also operating flights with Vickers Viscount turboprops with daily nonstop service from Honolulu with this flight continuing on to Kona (KOA) at this time.
In 1976, Hawaiian Airlines was operating daily McDonnell Douglas DC-9-30 jet service into the airport with a round trip routing of HNL-OGG-MUE.  By 1981, Hawaiian Airlines was serving the airport with de Havilland Canada DHC-7 Dash 7 turboprops on nonstop flights between Waimea and Kahului, Maui and Honolulu.

Princeville Airways/Aloha Island Air also operated to Kamuela airport in the late 1980s & 1990's. https://en.m.wikipedia.org/wiki/Island_Air_(Hawaii)

References

Other sources 

 Essential Air Service documents (Docket OST-1997-2833) from the U.S. Department of Transportation:
 Order 2005-3-34: Reselecting Pacific Wings Airlines to provide essential air service (EAS) at Hana, Kalaupapa, and Kamuela, Hawaii, for the period from April 1, 2005, through March 31, 2007, at an annual rate of $1,597,422 for the first year and at an annual rate of $1,501,752 for the second year.
 Order 2006-12-3: Terminating the carrier-selection proceeding for Essential Air Service at Hana, Kalaupapa, and Kamuela, Hawaii. The incumbent EAS carrier, Pacific Wings, has proposed to continue to provide all three communities' EAS on a subsidy-free basis beginning April 1, 2007.

External links 
 Waimea-Kohala Airport (MUE) at Hawaii DOT
 Topographic map from USGS The National Map
 
 

Airports in Hawaii
Transportation in Hawaii County, Hawaii
Buildings and structures in Hawaii County, Hawaii
Essential Air Service
Airports established in 1953
1953 establishments in Hawaii